The National Association for the Support of Long Term Care (NASL) is a United States trade association of ancillary providers of products and services to the post-acute care industry. This includes nursing homes, assisted living, home care, inpatient rehabilitation facilities, independent living, adult day care, hospice and long-term care hospitals. NASL represents and advocates for its members on legislative and regulatory issues that impact the quality of care to patients in long-term care settings. NASL is headquartered in Washington, D.C.

NASL was formed in 1989 and represents over 100 companies providing medical products, medical services, and information technology to the post-acute care industry. NASL member companies employ over 25,000 therapy professionals and represent approximately 64% of the nation's long-term care health information technology providers.

NASL continually influences national healthcare policy, particularly, improved Medicare ancillary payments and assurance that laws and regulations are in place to promote quality patient care. NASL has established a positive working relationship with the Government and leads initiatives, such as, extension of the therapy cap exceptions process, an alternative to a therapy cap, competitive bidding process, and adoption of health information technology.

Every NASL member is active on one of four working committees: Medical Products, Medical Services, Information Technology, and Diagnostic Testing. NASL committees and leadership participate in and manage national and industry-wide coalitions, host and sponsor national and state education sessions, and the support the development of healthcare policy.

NASL members receive daily communications regarding federal and state government healthcare decision-making; participate directly in the government healthcare policy-making process; influence issues by speaking directly to elected, appointed, and senior health policy officials; and receive discounts on meeting registration.

External links
 NASL website

Health industry trade groups based in the United States